František Vejdovský (born 24 October 1849 in Kouřim - died 4 December 1939 in Prague) was a Czech zoologist. 
In 2007 the International Commission on Zoological Nomenclature ruled that the family "Tubificidae" was a junior synonym of Naididae. He was the first biologist to distinguish between nematodes and gordiids when he named a group to contain the horsehair worms the order Nematomorpha. In 1919, Nathan Cobb proposed that nematodes should be recognized alone as a phylum and Nematomorphs were recognized as their own phylum.

References

1849 births
1939 deaths
Czech zoologists
Academic staff of Charles University
People from Kolín District